Lamar Tremane Herron (born October 27, 1984) is a former professional Canadian football defensive back for the Edmonton Eskimos of the Canadian Football League. He was signed by the Eskimos as a street free agent in 2009. He played college football at Oregon State and Texas Southern.

Born in Alameda, Herron graduated from Natomas High School in Sacramento, California. He attended Oregon State University and played for the Oregon State Beavers from 2004 to 2005 before transferring to Texas Southern University.

As a senior at Texas Southern in 2007, Herron led the team in total tackles (68).

References

External links
CFLPA bio
Just Sports Stats
Oregon State bio

1984 births
Living people
Sportspeople from Alameda, California
American football defensive backs
American players of Canadian football
Canadian football defensive backs
Edmonton Elks players
Oregon State Beavers football players
Texas Southern Tigers football players
Players of American football from Sacramento, California
Players of Canadian football from Sacramento, California